Stéphanie Foretz and Amandine Hesse are the defending champions, but retired in the second round to Alexandra Cadanțu and Cristina Dinu.

Cadanțu and Dinu won the title, defeating Viktorija Golubic and Alice Matteucci in the final, 7–5, 6–3.

Seeds

Draw

Draw

References
Main Draw

Open Engie de Touraine - Doubles